Rahi Mo'ayeri ( رهی معیری in Persian) (April 30, 1909 – November 15, 1968) né: Mohammad Hasan Mo'ayyeri (محمد حسن  معیری in Persian), was an Iranian poet and musician.

He was born into an artistic and musical family on April 30, 1909 in Tehran. His uncle was the famous Qajar Era poet Foroughi Bastami. He began to write poetry when he was seventeen years old and chose Rahi as his pen name. Rahi studied the works of all the great masters of Persian literature, but was especially fond of Saadi, whose influence is readily visible in his poetry.
Rahi was a composer as well as a poet. Rouhollah Khaleghi and Rahi met in 1941, and from this point on, Rahi wrote the lyrics for most of Khaleghi’s compositions as well as those of Morteza Mahjoubi, Ali Tajvidi, Hossein Yahaqqi, Moussa Maroufi, and Javad Maroufi. Rouhollah Khaleghi said that he was especially impressed with Rahi’s ability to fit words to music. Rahi’s poems have been published in Saye-ye Omr Sayeh Omr (سايه عمر in Persian) (translated "The Shadow of Life") (1964), Azadeh (1974), and Javdaneh Rahi (1984). Rahi had a deep friendship with Mr. Davood Pirnia (the founder of Golha Program) and due to that friendship he did a lot of work with Morteza khan Mahjoubi in the Golha Programs. Some people believe that the late 1950s and 1960s were the golden age of Persian music. After the resignation of Mr. Pirnia, Rahi agreed to run the Golha Program and continued to do so up until his illness. Although his poems have very beautiful romantic atmosphere, he never got married. According to his interview with Taghi Rouhani in 1960, he said: “when marriage comes from a door, love will leave from another door”. One of his last works was Golhayeh Rangarang #470 that was sung by Haydeh with music by Master Tajvidi (Some claim that this is the song that made Haydeh famous).

His book Sayeh Omr (سايه عمر in Persian) (translated "The Shadow of Life") of poems was printed in 1964.

He died on November 15, 1968 in Tehran. He is buried in the Zahir o-dowleh cemetery in the northern parts of Tehran.

Notes

دیدی که رسوا شد دلم، غرق تمنا شد دلم

دیدی که من با این دل بی آرزو عاشق شدم

با آن همه آزادگی، بر زلف او عاشق شدم

ای وای اگر صیاد من، غافل شود از یاد من، قدرم نداند

فریاد اگر از کوی خود، وز رشته‌ی گیسوی خود، بازم رهاند

در پیش بی دردان چرا، فریاد بی‌حاصل کنم

گر شکوه‌ای دارم ز دل، با یار صاحبدل کنم

وای ز دردی که درمان ندارد

فتادم به راهی که پایان ندارد

شنیدم بوی او، مستانه رفتم سوی او

تا چون غبار کوی او، در کوی جان منزل کند

وای ز دردی که درمان ندارد

فتادم به راهی که پایان ندارد

دیدی که رسوا شد دلم، غرق تمنا شد دلم

دیدی که در گرداب غم، از فتنه‌ی گردون رهی

افتادم و سرگشته چون، امواج دریا شد دلم

دیدی که رسوا شد دلم، غرق تمنا شد دلم

References
 Mo’ayyeri, Mohammad Hasan - Encyclopedia Iranica Online.

See also

Persian literature

20th-century Iranian poets
People from Tehran
1909 births
1968 deaths
20th-century poets
Iranian male poets
20th-century male writers
Poets from Tehran